Jacobus Malan "Baby" Michau (14 August 1890 – 20 June 1945) was a South African international rugby union player. Born in Cradock, he attended Cradock High School before playing provincial rugby for Transvaal. He made his only Test appearance for South Africa during their 1921 tour of New Zealand. He played as a lock for the 1st Test of the series, a 13–5 loss at Carisbrook. Michau died in 1945, in Boksburg, at the age of 54.

References

South African rugby union players
South Africa international rugby union players
Rugby union locks
1890 births
1945 deaths
People from Cradock, Eastern Cape
Rugby union players from the Eastern Cape
Golden Lions players